Heliopolis University is a non-profit university in Egypt with the mission of sustainable development. In Fall 2018, Heliopolis University had around 1,700 students in five faculties.

Location 
Heliopolis University is located in Salam City, El Horreya, greater Cairo, near Cairo International Airport and Belbeis Desert Road.

Overview 

Heliopolis University was established by presidential decree 298/2009 in 2009. In 2012 the first 128 students enrolled in the faculties of Business and Economics, Engineering and Pharmacy.

The idea to create a sustainable university was developed by Ibrahim Abouleish, the leader of the SEKEM initiative, which was founded in 1977. In his vision the university is an important part in the SEKEM Initiative.
Like other parts of SEKEM, the University follows sustainable principles. These principles are divided in different dimensions, like societal, cultural, and business life, which have to go hand in hand with the environment. The SEKEM Initiative handled these four main dimensions in a specific framework, which called sustainable flower.

Based on this framework, students not only learn their specific curricula, but also take lessons in arts, culture, social sciences, environmental studies, and foreign languages. These skills are handled in an obligatory study which is called Core program. 
For teaching purposes and to promote sustainability, Heliopolis University operates a wastewater system and several photovoltaic installations, students and staff can use a cafeteria, a restaurant, as well as sport and leisure facilities. Furthermore a botanical garden is integrated in the campus of the University.

Social and Environmental Interaction 

Theory:

 All natural resources are limited, like water, oil, food, nutrition and fertile soil. Because of this, people need to think about    future generations too.
 to create a sustainable change creative, innovative as well educated people are needed who can solve the current and future challenges and implement solutions.
 Sustainability means also teamwork and solidarity. 
 Theory and praxis must work together.

Praxis:

 Experiences to save natural resources are collected by Heliopolis University and its mother organisation SEKEM, for instance to economize resources like water and electricity. The experiences gained by SEKEM are used in different curricula at the university. 
 With the collected experiences Heliopolis University provides access to educate people for the sustainable change. 
 To foster teamwork, solidarity and creativity Heliopolis University created the Core program, where different people are encouraged to work together. Furthermore they can develop their societal and cultural skills. 
 Next to studying, Heliopolis University offers different internships that enable students to practice what they have learned.

Faculties 

Since the opening of the faculties of Organic Agriculture and Physical Therapy in 2018,

the Heliopolis University runs five degree-granting faculties. The first academic year started in 2012 with the three faculties in engineering, business and pharmacy. All of these faculties are based on a sustainable concept which keeps the balance between human and environment and theory and practice.

The 5 faculties with Bachelor degrees, master degrees are currently not offered:

The Core Program 

To encourage students’ learning capacity and to support their different skills, Heliopolis University developed the Core Program. It should maximize the student’s creativity, innovation ability and social responsibility. Furthermore students should learn problem- solving, critical thinking and to deal with stress and big challenges.

To reach these aims the core program implements different learning courses. These are:

 Arts
 Social sciences
 Sustainability

The Space of Culture 

The Space of Culture aims to connect different cultures. It is a tool to bring students, professors and people around the world from diverse universities, countries and cultures together. The Space of Culture is based on the philosophy to enable an intercultural meeting point and a crossroad between orient and occident, between West, East, North and South.

This cultural interactivity will provide different programs where people can change ideas and opinions.

 Poetry recitation
 Choirs
 Theatrical performances 
 Workshops about intercultural dialogues 
 Documentary movies
 Musical performances

International Partners 
Alanus University of Arts and Social Sciences, Germany
Cairo University, Egypt
Ain Shams University, Egypt
Zuyd University of Applied Sciences, Netherlands
University of Maribor, Slovenia
Marburg University, Germany
RWTH Aachen, Germany
TU Graz, Austria
University of Hohenheim, Germany
University of Osnabrück, Germany

References

External links
 Heliopolis University website

Universities in Egypt
Educational institutions established in 2009
2009 establishments in Egypt